Éléonor Jacques Marie Stanislas Perier de Salvert (17481783) was a lieutenant de vaisseau in the French Navy.

Biography 

He was the son of Antoine Alexis Perier de Salvert and Angélique Aimée Rosalie de Laduz de Vieuxchamps. He joined the Navy as a Garde-Marine on 5 April 1762, and was promoted to Lieutenant on 14 February 1778.

In 1772, he was captain of the 4-gun cutter Furet.

In 1776, he was at Isle de France (Mauritius).

He served under Jean-Baptiste François Lollivier de Tronjoly on the 64-gun Brillant from 20 August to 3 September 1778, when he transferred to the frigate Pourvoyeuse as Saint-Orens' first officer. From 9 October to 9 December, he was in command of Enighed, a Danish prize that he brought to Port-Louis Later, he was promoted to the command of the frigate Fine.

On 14 July 1782, he was given command of the 54-gun Flamand, replacing Cuverville who had been promoted to the Vengeur. 

He was killed in action at the Battle of Cuddalore on 20 June 1783, by the first broadside fired by the British.

References

Sources

See also 
 Antoine-Alexis Perier de Salvert
 Étienne Perier

1748 births
1783 deaths
French Navy officers
French military personnel killed in the American Revolutionary War